1923 is an American Western drama television series that premiered on December 18, 2022, on Paramount+. The series is a prequel to the Paramount Network series Yellowstone and serves as a sequel to the series 1883. In February 2023, the series was renewed for a second season of eight episodes.

Premise
Follows a generation of the Dutton family in 1923, during a time of various hardships including Prohibition, drought, and the early stages of the Great Depression, which affected Montana long before the 1929 Stock Market Crash.

Cast

Main 
 
 Helen Mirren as Cara Dutton, the wife to Jacob Dutton and Dutton family matriarch. Having no children of their own, Jacob and Cara raised John and Spencer Dutton as their own.
 Harrison Ford as Jacob Dutton, the patriarch of the Dutton ranch, and the older brother of James Dutton (portrayed by Tim McGraw in 1883). 
 Brandon Sklenar as Spencer Dutton, the younger son of James and Margaret Dutton. Spencer has witnessed the horrors of World War I and travels Africa tracking big game. Charlie Stover portrayed Spencer Dutton as a child during flashbacks set in 1893 in two episodes of the fourth season of Yellowstone.
 Julia Schlaepfer as Alexandra, a freethinking British woman who encounters Spencer in Africa.
 Jerome Flynn as Banner Creighton, a Scottish sheepherder and adversary of the Duttons.
 Darren Mann as Jack Dutton, John Dutton Sr.'s son and only child, James Dutton's grandson, and great-nephew to Jacob Dutton. He is a dedicated rancher who is deeply loyal to his family.
 Isabel May as the Narrator, Elsa Dutton. May also portrayed Elsa Dutton in 1883.
 Brian Geraghty as Zane Davis, the fiercely loyal ranch foreman of the Dutton Ranch.
 Aminah Nieves as Teonna Rainwater, a rebellious young American Indian woman who was taken from her family and placed in an Indian boarding school for girls run by the Catholic Church.
 Michelle Randolph as Elizabeth "Liz" Strafford, a feisty and capable young woman and Jack Dutton's fiancée.
 Timothy Dalton as Donald Whitfield, a powerful, wealthy business tycoon who is accustomed to getting what he wants.

Recurring 

 Robert Patrick as Sheriff William McDowell, the sheriff of Gallatin County and a friend of the Dutton family.
 Jennifer Ehle as Sister Mary, a ruthless and abusive Irish Catholic nun who teaches at a Catholic boarding school for American Indians, often coming into conflict with Teonna.
 Sebastian Roché as Father Renaud, a French Roman Catholic priest and the abusive headmaster of the Catholic boarding school.
 Marley Shelton as Emma Dutton, the wife of John Dutton Sr. and the mother of Jack Dutton.
 Leenah Robinson as Baapuxti, an American Indian student at the Catholic boarding school and Teonna's cousin.
 Caleb Martin as Dennis, a hired ranch hand working at the Dutton ranch.
 Brian Konowal as Clyde / Clive, a Scottish sheepherder, a long-time associate of Creighton and former Chicago police officer working as a spy for Whitfield.
 Michael Greyeyes as Hank Plenty Clouds, a Crow sheepherder from the Broken Rock Reservation who encounters Teonna while she's on the run.

Guest 

 James Badge Dale as John Dutton Sr., the eldest son of James and Margaret Dutton, Jacob Dutton's oldest nephew and right-hand man. Audie Rick portrayed John Dutton as a child in 1883. Jack Michael Doke portrayed him as a teenager during flashbacks set in 1893 in two episodes of the fourth season of Yellowstone.
 Kerry O'Malley as Sister Alice, an ostensibly compassionate nun at the Catholic boarding school who takes advantage of those under her care.
 Tim DeKay as Bob Strafford, Elizabeth's rancher father and a neighbor to the Duttons.
 Nick Boraine as Richard Holland, the head of a safari tour group in Africa who hires Spencer to hunt man-eaters.
 Bruce Davison as Prince Arthur, Earl of Sussex, the father of Alexandra's former fiancé and member of the British royal family.
 Michael Spears as Runs His Horse, the chief of the Broken Rock Reservation, Teonna's father and a neighbor to the Duttons.
 Amelia Rico as Issaxche Rainwater, a Apsáalooke (Crow) woman seeking to reunite with her granddaughter Teonna.
 Jo Ellen Pellman as Jennifer, a British socialite and friend of Alexandra.
 Rafe Soule as Young Arthur, the son of Prince Arthur and Alexandra's former fiancé.
 Colin Moss as Charles Hardin, a Colonial British railroad construction supervisor in Tanganyika who hires Spencer to eliminate a man-eating Hyena.
 Jessalyn Gilsig as Beverly Strafford, Elizabeth's mother who is accustomed to city life.
 Peter Stormare as Lucca, a terminally ill tugboat captain based in Mombasa.
 Tanc Sade as Father Cillian, a Catholic priest sent to track down Teonna.
 Joseph Mawle as Captain Shipley, the British sea captain of the S.S. Lambridge.
 Jamie McShane as Marshal Kent, a U.S. Marshal who leads the search for Teonna.
 Currie Graham as Chadwick Benton, an attorney hired by Whitfield to represent Creighton.
 Cailyn Rice as Christy, a prostitute
 Madison Rogers as Lindy, a prostitute
 Cole Brings Plenty as Pete Plenty Clouds, Hank's teenage son and a sheepherder.
 Wallace Langham as Kyle Murphy, a loan officer in Bozeman who refuses to authorize a loan for Jacob.
 Joy Osmanski as Alice Davis (née Chow), Zane's wife, who is kept a secret due to anti-miscegenation laws.
 Damian O'Hare as Captain Hurley, the sea captain of the RMS Majestic.

Episodes

Season 1 (2022–23)

Production

Development
It was announced in February 2022 that a second Yellowstone prequel series had been ordered titled 1932 that would succeed the series 1883.

In June, the title was renamed to 1923.

In December 2022, Taylor Sheridan explained "No one has had the freedom I’ve had since Robert Evans ran Paramount," and discussed the 1923 production cost: "I would argue that 1883 was the most expensive first season of a TV show ever made. This was much more expensive. Much more expensive." In February 2023, Paramount+ renewed the series for a second season.

Writing 
Sheridan's writing in the series was influenced by the other spin-offs from Yellowstone; for example, both prequel shows are written as being narrated by Isabel May, who in the 1883 series played Elsa, the daughter of James and Margaret Dutton. May is the only actor who has main cast credits on both prequel shows.

Casting
In May 2022, Helen Mirren and Harrison Ford were cast to star in the series. They had previously starred together 36 years ago in The Mosquito Coast. Ford, as revealed in a February 2023 interview with James Hibberd of The Hollywood Reporter, took up the offer to play Jacob Dutton despite mentioning years ago in 2002 that he works only once a year, citing the COVID-19 pandemic and his commitments to the titular role of the long-delayed Indiana Jones and the Dial of Destiny as one of the reasons he had done not much work as he wished and wanted to try on new things. Similarly to his role in Shrinking, Ford accepted the role despite there not being a script at the time, trusting that Sheridan would deliver him a good script.

In a Deadline Hollywood interview, Sheridan explained he got Ford to fly down in his own plane to Sheridan's ranch, and told him "[the script] ain’t written yet and you got to commit to it now. I need to know who I’m writing for... I poured about two bottles of wine down him. He said yes". Then Sheridan continued, "Then came Helen [Mirren], and same thing. Have a glass of wine".

In September 2022, Sebastian Roché, James Badge Dale, Darren Mann, Marley Shelton, Michelle Randolph, Brian Geraghty, Aminah Nieves, and Julia Schlaepfer were added to the cast.

Filming
Pre-production began in Butte, Montana in July 2022,

Filming was scheduled to begin  on August 22, also in Butte, since that city was the stand-in for Bozeman, Montana. Principal photography took place across Montana, with many Montana-set scenes shot in the same locations as Yellowstone. Additional scenes were filmed in Kenya, Malta, South Africa, and Tanzania. Some of the scenes that take place on the ocean liner RMS Majestic, were actually filmed at the RMS Queen Mary which is now a floating hotel, docked in Long Beach, California.

The show was predicted to cost between $30–35 million per episode.

The series is set to run for two seasons with eight episodes each. In February 2023, the series was renewed for a second season.

The first season was broadcast in two blocks of four episodes each, with a month-long gap between the fourth and fifth episodes.

Reception 
On the review aggregation website Rotten Tomatoes, 1923 holds a 91% approval rating with an average rating of 7.0/10, based on 32 reviews by critics. The website's consensus reads, "Distinguished by the ineffable star power of Harrison Ford and Helen Mirren, 1923 is another solid if unrelentingly grim addition to Taylor Sheridan's Yellowstone universe." On Metacritic, which uses a weighted average, the series has received a score of 67 out of 100 based on 15 critic reviews, indicating "generally favorable reviews".

According to Paramount, the debut episode brought in 7.4 million viewers in both linear and streaming telecasts, making it Paramount+'s biggest debut ever.

References

External links
 
 

2020s American drama television series
2020s Western (genre) television series
2022 American television series debuts
American prequel television series
English-language television shows
Fiction set in 1923
Paramount+ original programming
Television series created by Taylor Sheridan
Television series set in the 1920s
Television shows filmed in Montana
Television shows set in Montana